Gug Tappeh (also Romanized as Gūg Tappeh and Gowg Tappeh; also known as Gowk Tappeh, Gog Tappeh, Gūk Tappeh, and Guk Tepe) is a village in Deymkaran Rural District, Salehabad District, Bahar County, Hamadan Province, Iran. At the 2006 census, its population was 295, in 65 families.

References 

Populated places in Bahar County